John Stewart Higgins (1940–2012) was an Irish international lawn and indoor bowler.

Bowls career
He started bowling aged 15 and won a bronze medal in the triples at the 1976 World Outdoor Bowls Championship in Johannesburg. He also won a bronze medal in fours at the 1970 British Commonwealth Games in Edinburgh.

He won the 1969 Irish National Bowls Championships singles.

Higgins plied his trade with YRCD bowling club through all of his career. Since his death the CD Hall as it is known has been renovated and also incorporates the HUBB Community Resource Centre, where a mural proudly stands of John playing bowls for his club.

References

1940 births
2012 deaths
Male lawn bowls players from Northern Ireland
Commonwealth Games medallists in lawn bowls
Commonwealth Games bronze medallists for Northern Ireland
Bowls players at the 1970 British Commonwealth Games
Medallists at the 1970 British Commonwealth Games